Limnaecia semisecta is a moth in the family Cosmopterigidae. It is found in Zimbabwe.

References

Natural History Museum Lepidoptera generic names catalog

Limnaecia
Moths described in 1928
Taxa named by Edward Meyrick
Moths of Africa